Polypedates megacephalus, the Hong Kong whipping frog or spot-legged tree frog, is a species in the shrub frog family (Rhacophoridae). In its native range, it is also called "brown tree frog", but this name is otherwise applied to a species of the true tree frog family (Hylidae).

Distribution and ecology
This species is native in central, southern and southwestern China (including Hong Kong and Hainan) and Indo-China peninsula. It is closely related to Polypedates leucomystax and always included in P. leucomystex species complex, along with P. mutus and P. braueri.

Previously, P. megacephalus was thought to distribute above the Red River of Vietnam and in Northeast India, while P. leucomystex was generally found south of the Red River and in western Yunnan. However, recent genetic studies revealed that the natural barriers between these species are the Isthmus of Kra and the Tenasserim Range, where P. megacephalus can be found above the isthmus and east of the range.

This frog is listed as Least Concern in view of its wide distribution in Asia and its tolerance of a broad range of habitats. It also because of its presumed large population.

Images

References

Amphibians of China
Fauna of Hong Kong
Frogs of India
Amphibians of Taiwan
Amphibians described in 1861